Kachliner See is a lake in Usedom, Mecklenburg-Vorpommern, Germany. At an elevation of 0 m, its surface area is 1.00 km².

Lakes of Mecklenburg-Western Pomerania